Bridgham Farm is an historic farm in East Providence, Rhode Island. The main farmhouse, built in 1767, now stands on Morra Way, a subdivision created out of some of the farm's lands. A portion of the farmland is now locally managed conservation land by the East Providence Land Conservation Trust. A direct descendant of the family, Clive Willard Bridgham, received the original land grant from King George III. He lived there until he was found murdered in his house on January 11, 2018.

The farm was listed on the National Historic Register in 1980.

The conservation land has a few trails, which lead out from the west entrance on Pleasant Street. These trails lead to the Turner Reservoir, and the Turner Reservoir Loop Trail.

See also
National Register of Historic Places listings in Providence County, Rhode Island

References

Farms on the National Register of Historic Places in Rhode Island
Houses in Providence County, Rhode Island
Buildings and structures in East Providence, Rhode Island
Protected areas of Providence County, Rhode Island
1767 establishments in Rhode Island
National Register of Historic Places in Providence County, Rhode Island